The Ministry of Indigenous Peoples' Affairs  (MIPA), is the regional executive department of the Bangsamoro Autonomous Region in Muslim Mindanao (BARMM) responsible for affairs relating to non-Muslim indigenous people in the region.

History
The Bangsamoro Organic Law, the legislation which serves as the charter of the Bangsamoro Autonomous Region in Muslim Mindanao mandates the establishment of a ministry to deal with the affairs of non-Muslim indigenous people in the region as well as work with the regional implementation of national-level legislation concerning indigenous peoples.

Timuay Ulama was appointed on February 26, 2019 by interim Chief Minister Murad Ebrahim as the newly reconfigured Bangsamoro department's first minister.

Ministers

References

Indigenous Peoples' Affairs